Urban Search and Rescue California Task Force 8 or CA-TF8 is a FEMA Urban Search and Rescue Task Force based in San Diego, California.  CA-TF8 is sponsored by the San Diego Fire Department.

References

California 8
Government of San Diego